The Heads of Proposals was a set of propositions intended to be a basis for a constitutional settlement after King Charles I was defeated in the First English Civil War. The authorship of the Proposals has been the subject of scholarly debate, although it has been suggested that it was drafted in the summer of 1647 by Commissionary-General Henry Ireton and Major-General John Lambert.

Background and Newcastle propositions 
In 1646 the Scots captured King Charles I and opened negotiations with Parliament.  It demanded the  Newcastle propositions that included accepting the covenant, installing a Presbyterian form of church government, giving Parliament control of the Army for 20 years, and turn over key supporters for punishment. Charles refused to accept these stiff terms.

Main propositions 
The main propositions were:
 Royalists had to wait five years before running for or holding an office.
 The Book of Common Prayer was allowed to be read but not mandatory, and no penalties should be made for not going to church, or attending other acts of worship.
 The sitting Parliament was to set a date for its own termination. Thereafter, biennial Parliaments were to be called (i.e. every two years), which would sit for a minimum of 120 days and maximum of 240 days. Constituencies were to be reorganized.
 Episcopacy would be retained in church government, but the power of the bishops would be substantially reduced.
 Parliament was to control the appointment of state officials and officers in the army and navy for 10 years.

King Charles' reaction 
Even after the occupation of London by the New Model Army had taken place, Parliament, instead of taking up the Heads of the Proposals as the basis of a settlement of the kingdom, sent to the King a revised edition of the Newcastle Propositions, differing mainly in that it proposed a limited toleration for dissentient Puritans, whilst forbidding all use of the book of Common Prayer. In his reply to their propositions, the King, on 14 September, expressed a preference for the Proposals of the Army, as more conducive "to the satisfaction of all interests and a fitter foundation for a lasting peace". Major Huntington's letter shows that the King expected the leaders of the Army to stand by him in procuring an offer of better terms from parliament.

The question of a new treaty was discussed in the House of Commons on 22 and 23 September 1647. Henry Marten and his party were eager for the passing of a vote to make no further addresses to the King. Cromwell and Ireton, on the other hand, opposed Marten's motion, and the House finally resolved on 23 September that they would once again make application to the King. This decision led to much discontent amongst the Levelling party in the Army as also outside of it, and "the credit and reputation" of both Cromwell and Ireton was much blasted thereby. They were accused of falsely representing it to be the desire and sense of the Army that this new application should be made to the King. The charge is thus stated by Wildman in his Putney Projects (p. 43).

Because Oliver Cromwell and Henry Ireton negotiated with the King, they lost the army radicals' support. The radicals criticized their "servility" to the king. Without an amicable solution between the Army, King, English Parliament, and the Scots the Second English Civil War started.

Historical importance 
Although the "Heads of Proposals" was never adopted, Ireton promoted it in the Putney Debates. He presented it as a moderate alternative to the Agreement of the People. Elements of "Heads of Proposals" were incorporated in the Instrument of Government. The Instrument of Government was the written constitution that defined Oliver Cromwell's powers as Lord Protector. The religious settlement proposed by Ireton in 1647 was virtually identical to that finally adopted in the Toleration Act 1688.

References
 The Heads of the Proposals offered by the Army August 1, 1647.  Cites as a source Rushworth, vii. 731. See Great Civil War, iii. 329–333, 340–343.]
Far, David (2006). Henry Ireton and the English Revolution, Boydell Press, 
Firth, C. H. (editor, Camden Society, 1901). Politics and the Army in the English Civil War Part 1, The Clarke Papers. Selections from the Papers of William Clarke, Secretary to the Council of the Army, 1647-1649, and to General Monck and the Commanders of the Army in Scotland, 1651-1660, Volume I.
Plant, David Heads of the Proposals, 1647, British Civil Wars & Commonwealth website, Retrieved 2009-12-07
 Tyacke, Nicholas (2001). Aspects of English Protestantism, c. 1530-1700, Manchester University Press, 

Attribution

Footnotes

English Civil War
1647 in England
Republicanism in England
17th-century documents